Cerma is a genus of moths of the family Noctuidae. The genus was erected by Jacob Hübner in 1818.

Species
 Cerma cerintha Treitschke, 1826
 Cerma cora Hübner, 1818
 Cerma sirius Barnes & McDunnough, 1918

References

Acronictinae